Point Lonsdale Lighthouse, also known as the Point Lonsdale Signal Station, is close to the township of Point Lonsdale in the Borough of Queenscliffe, Victoria, Australia.  It stands at the eastern end of the Bellarine Peninsula, on the western side of the entrance to Port Phillip from Bass Strait, on a headland overlooking the "Rip", a stretch of water considered one of the ten most treacherous navigable passages in the world, and the only seaborne approach to Melbourne. It is operated by Victorian Ports Corporation (Melbourne).

Description
The lighthouse was designed by the Victorian Public Works Department and erected by the contractors Coates Brothers.  It is of a traditional design consisting of a cylindrical tower and capital, similar to many late nineteenth century Victorian lighthouses, such as the earlier Point Hicks Lighthouse.  It is built of reinforced concrete and surmounted by a Chance Brothers lantern. The original oil lamp of the light was first replaced with an acetylene light and later an electric light. Surrounding its base is the octagonal, two-storey, brick signal station and observation room.  Halfway up the tower is a cantilevered platform supporting red and green navigation lights.

History
The first navigation aid at Point Lonsdale was a signal station erected in 1852.  In 1856 a red pillar beacon was built.  In 1863 the original Queenscliff Low Light, a prefabricated wooden structure, was re-erected at Point Lonsdale and painted with distinctive black and red bands.  It used a temporary light until a permanent light was lit in 1867.  It was replaced by the current concrete tower in 1902, with the wooden tower dismantled and cut up for firewood in 1912.

Responsibility for the light passed in 1915 from the state of Victoria to Commonwealth control.  It was handed back in 1934 with the lighthouse classified as a “Harbour Entrance Light” rather than a "Coastal Highway Light".  The signal station and observation room were added to the base of the tower in 1950.  Although the light was automated in 1999, the signal station continues to be staffed and controls the movements of commercial shipping within designated areas both outside and inside Port Phillip Heads, making it possibly the last manned lighthouse in Australia.

Heritage values

The Point Lonsdale Lighthouse precinct contains not only the lighthouse itself, but other buildings associated with lighthouse operations and navigation, as well as nearby military defence structures built during the First and Second World Wars. The whole precinct is considered to be of architectural, historical and archaeological significance to the State of Victoria, and has been listed by Heritage Victoria with the Victorian Heritage Database number H1517.

It is of historical significance because of its association with the maritime and defence history of the state. The lighthouse structures in the precinct show the importance of navigational aids at a time when shipping was vitally important in maintaining trade between Victorian ports and the rest of the world. The lighthouse was the first guiding light to the entrance of Port Phillip visible from the sea. The defence structures reflect the importance of the defence of Port Phillip and its major cities of Melbourne and Geelong during the two World Wars.

The lighthouse precinct buildings, including a foghorn shed built in 1884 and an explosives shed (later used as a rocket shed) built in 1891, are of architectural significance. The lighthouse is a typical and aesthetically pleasing example of an early 20th-century lighthouse design. The foghorn shed is the only one known from a Victorian lighthouse, and the one Gardner Engine that remains on site sends compressed air to two vertical holding tanks which power the foghorn, all rare in its original setting. The precinct is of archaeological significance for its potential to reveal artefactual remains pertaining to the use of the site as a lightstation and signal station.

The lighthouse today
The lighthouse's exterior was restored in 1997 and, in 2002, Heritage Victoria and the Victorian Channels Authority cooperated to restore the interior.  Celebrations of the structure's centenary were held on 23 March 2002.  It contains a restored foghorn which is operated in foggy weather, giving a double blast every 30 seconds. There is public access to the area around the tower.  Organised tours of the tower are conducted on Sundays by the Queenscliffe Maritime Museum.  The marine waters around the lighthouse are protected within the Port Phillip Heads Marine National Park.

See also

 List of lighthouses in Australia

References

Sources

External links

 Point Lonsdale Lighthouse webcams

Port Phillip
Bellarine Peninsula
Octagonal buildings
Lighthouses completed in 1902
Lighthouses in Victoria (Australia)
1902 establishments in Australia
Maritime museums in Australia
Lighthouse museums in Australia
Borough of Queenscliffe